Klara Segałowicz (25 August 1897 – 1943) was a Polish actress. She was active in theatre and film between 1921 and 1939. A Jew, she and her husband were arrested following the invasion of Poland in 1939. They were interned in the Warsaw Ghetto and later held at Pawiak prison, where they were shot and killed in 1943.

Select filmography
Jeden z 36 (1925)
W lasach polskich (1929)
Ał chet (1936)

References

External links

1897 births
1943 deaths
Actors from Kyiv
Polish stage actresses
Polish film actresses
20th-century Polish actresses
Polish civilians killed in World War II
Polish Jews who died in the Holocaust
People who died in the Warsaw Ghetto
Polish people executed by Nazi Germany
People executed by Nazi Germany by firearm
Deaths by firearm in Poland